Amir Albazi (born October 27, 1993) is an Iraqi mixed martial artist who competes in the Flyweight division of the UFC. As of December 19, 2022, he is #7 in the UFC flyweight rankings.

Early life 

Amir was born in Baghdad. When he was seven years old, he fled Baghdad in the middle of the night and Amir and his family then went to Syria, where Amir saw his father for the first time since he was a toddler. The family stayed in Syria for a year and a half, before moving to Sweden.

Amir's family settled in Bredäng, a district in Stockholm in which immigrants and refugees made up 60% of the population. Amir got into a lot of fights and trouble as a kid, and ended up joining a street gang as a teen. His interest in mixed martial arts happened overnight, as he once watched an old UFC fight on television, having been impressed by this new type of professional fighting, Amir looked up the cheapest MMA gym and signed up the next day. Albazi moved to London in 2013, and graduated from University of Roehampton with a degree in sports science.

Career 

Amir's first fight came in the World Ultimate Full Contact 15, he defeated Pavlo Kulish in 59 seconds by making him submit. He went on an 8 bout win streak to start his MMA career before moving to Bellator, where he extended that streak to 10 bouts after defeating Jamie Powell and Iurie Bejenari. Amir's first loss came in the Middle eastern promotion Brave CF to Jose "Shorty" Torres. Amir rebounded from his loss by defeating Ryan Curtis in BRAVE CF 29.

Ultimate Fighting Championship 
Albazi made his UFC debut on short notice on July 18, 2020 against Malcolm Gordon at UFC Fight Night: Figueiredo vs. Benavidez 2. Amir defeated Gordon by submission inside 4 minutes and 42 seconds of the first round.

Albazi was expected to face Raulian Paiva on October 31, 2020, at UFC Fight Night: Hall vs. Silva. However, Paiva pulled out of the fight on 11 September citing a knee injury and Albazi was removed from the card.

Amir was then scheduled to face Zhalgas Zhumagulov at UFC on ESPN: Smith vs. Clark on November 28, 2020, but Zhumagulov pulled out due to visa issues and the bout was rescheduled for UFC 257 on January 24, 2021. Albazi won the bout via unanimous decision.

He was then scheduled to face Ode' Osbourne at UFC on ESPN: Makhachev vs. Moisés on July 17, 2021. However, Albazi withdrew from the bout due to undisclosed reasons.

Albazi was next scheduled to face Tim Elliott at UFC on ESPN: Tsarukyan vs. Gamrot on June 25, 2022. However, Elliott pulled out in mid June due to undisclosed reasons and the bout was scrapped.

Albazi faced Francisco Figueiredo on August 20, 2022 at UFC 278. He won the bout via rear-naked choke at the end of first round.

Albazi was scheduled to face Alex Perez on December 17, 2022 at UFC Fight Night 216. However, with Perez withdrawing from the fight, Albazi wound up scheduled against Brandon Royval instead. In late November, Royval pulled out of the bout due to  a broken wrist, and was replaced by promotional newcomer Alessandro Costa. Albazi won the fight via knockout in round three.

Albazi is scheduled to face Kai Kara-France on June 3, 2023 at UFC Fight Night 226.

Championships and accomplishments
Ultimate Challenge MMA
UCMMA Bantamweight Championship (one time; former)
FightStar Championship
FSC Bantamweight Championship (one time; former)

Mixed martial arts record

|-
|Win
|align=center|16–1
|Alessandro Costa
|KO (punches)
|UFC Fight Night: Cannonier vs. Strickland
| 
|align=center|3
|align=center|2:13
|Las Vegas, Nevada, United States
|
|-
|Win
|align=center|15–1
|Francisco Figueiredo
|Submission (rear-naked choke)
|UFC 278
|
|align=center|1
|align=center|4:34
|Salt Lake City, Utah, United States
|
|-
|Win
|align=center|14–1
|Zhalgas Zhumagulov
|Decision (unanimous)
|UFC 257 
|
|align=center|3
|align=center|5:00
|Abu Dhabi, United Arab Emirates
| 
|-
|Win
|align=center|13–1
|Malcolm Gordon
|Submission (triangle choke)
|UFC Fight Night: Figueiredo vs. Benavidez 2 
|
|align=center|1
|align=center|4:42
|Abu Dhabi, United Arab Emirates
|
|-
| Win
| align=center| 12–1
| Ryan Curtis
|Submission (kimura)
|Brave CF 29
|
|align=center|1
|align=center|2:24
|Isa Town, Bahrain
| 
|-
|Loss
|align=center|11–1
|Jose Torres
| Decision (unanimous)
|Brave CF 23
|
|align=center|3
|align=center|5:00
|Amman, Jordan
|
|-
| Win
| align=center| 11–0
| Iuri Bejenari
|Submission (rear-naked choke)
|Bellator 200 
|
|align=center|1
|align=center|3:21
|London, England
| 
|-
| Win
| align=center| 10–0
| Jamie Powell
|Decision (unanimous)
|Bellator 179 
|
|align=center|3
|align=center|5:00
|London, England
| 
|-
| Win
| align=center| 9–0
| Dino Gambatesa
| Submission (kimura)
| FightStar Championship 8
| 
| align=center| 1
| align=center| 4:30
| London, England
| 
|-
| Win
| align=center| 8–0
| Rafał Czechowski
| Submission (rear-naked choke)
| Scandinavian Fight Nights 1
| 
| align=center| 2
| align=center| N/A
| Solna, Sweden
| 
|-
| Win
| align=center| 7–0
| Niko Gjoka
| TKO (slam)
| Ultimate Challenge MMA 44
| 
| align=center| 2
| align=center| 2:21
| London, England
| 
|-
| Win
| align=center| 6–0
| Ondřej Moravec
| TKO (punches)
| Bitva Roku 2015
| 
| align=center| 1
| align=center| 4:34
| Prague, Czech Republic
| 
|-
| Win
| align=center| 5–0
| Salih Kulucan
| Submission (kimura)
| Ultimate Challenge MMA 41
| 
| align=center| 2
| align=center| 2:30
| London, England
| 
|-
| Win
| align=center| 4–0
| Ally McRae
| Submission (rear-naked choke)
| SFC 3
| 
| align=center| 2
| align=center| 0:00
| Stirling, Scotland
| 
|-
| Win
| align=center| 3–0
| Bagandov Murada
| TKO (punches)
| World Ultimate Full Contact 16
| 
| align=center| 1
| align=center| 3:00
| Viseu, Portugal
| 
|-
| Win
| align=center| 2–0
| Andre Batista
| TKO (punches)
|rowspan=2 |  World Ultimate Full Contact 15
|rowspan=2 |  
| align=center| 1
| align=center| 3:35
|rowspan=2 | Viseu, Portugal
| 
|-
| Win
| align=center| 1–0
| Pavlo Kulish
| Submission (rear-naked choke)
| align=center| 1
| align=center| 0:59
|

See also 
 List of current UFC fighters
 List of male mixed martial artists

References

External links 
  
 

1993 births
Living people
Iraqi male mixed martial artists
Swedish male mixed martial artists
Flyweight mixed martial artists
Mixed martial artists utilizing Brazilian jiu-jitsu
Iraqi practitioners of Brazilian jiu-jitsu
Swedish practitioners of Brazilian jiu-jitsu
Sportspeople from Baghdad
Iraqi emigrants to Sweden
Ultimate Fighting Championship male fighters